Songs to Make Life Slightly Less Awkward is the second album by English musician Frank Hamilton. It was released digitally on 30 September 2016 and debuted at number 19 in the Indie Breakers Chart. The physical copies were released in stores three weeks later on 21 October 2016 and featured as part of HMV's recommended listening

The album was dubbed "an existential crisis set to music" and lauded by critics including The Independent, The Mirror and BBC 6 Music.

STMLSLA featured the singles "Songs We Fall Asleep To", "Lovedrug", "Saturday Night" and "More or Less", a duet with Dodie Clark, which was released alongside a written piece for Mental Health Awareness Week.

Track list

References

2016 albums
Pop albums by English artists